The 2020 French Road Cycling Cup was the 29th edition of the French Road Cycling Cup. Compared to the previous season, the same 15 events were held. The cup was heavily impacted by the COVID-19 pandemic in France, as originally 16 races were scheduled, but only 8 were eventually held, including some replacement events.  The defending champion from the previous season was Marc Sarreau, he was succeeded by Nacer Bouhanni who managed to win two events.

Events
The calendar was heavily disturbed due to the COVID-19 pandemic. To obtain a reasonable number of events, replacement races were included in the calendar, such as the 1st stage of the Route d'Occitanie and the 4th stage of the Tour Poitou-Charentes en Nouvelle-Aquitaine. A notable race added was also the sprinters' classic Paris–Tours.

Final Cup standings

Individual
All competing riders are eligible for this classification.

Young rider classification
All riders younger than 25 are eligible for this classification.

Teams
Only French teams are eligible to be classified in the teams classification.

Notes

References

External links
  

French Road Cycling Cup
French Road Cycling Cup
Road Cycling